Salfords railway station serves the village of Salfords in Surrey, England. The station is sometimes shown as Salfords (Surrey) in timetables to differentiate it from the two stations in Salford, Greater Manchester. It is on the Brighton Main Line,  down the line from  via  and is managed by Southern. Train services are provided by Thameslink and Southern.

The station has four lines running through it: two slow lines with platforms and two express lines that have no platforms. The ticket office is open weekdays from 6:30 am to 10:30 am. There is an on-demand service announcement facility. A PERTIS machine is provided. Journey times are around  45 minutes to London, 25 to Croydon, 7 to Redhill  and Gatwick Airport, 10 to Crawley and 20 to Horsham.

History 

Salfords station was originally built in 1915 for workers at the Monotype Corporation, which had constructed a factory next to the railway line in 1899.  From its opening on 8 October 1915 the train service was not advertised and sparse to meet the needs of Monotype Corporation staff. On 17 July 1932 the line was electrified on 750 Volts DC third rail and concurrently the station was served by a regular advertised train service. The station name, originally Salfords Halt, was simplified to Salfords on 1 January 1935.

Day Aggregates made use of the open land beside the station to store and transport their loose stones for construction in the area for some time. The sidings used still exist, including a bay platform at the station and most of the machinery used to expel and fill the wagons that transported the stone at the site. 
Network Rail have a site at the back of platform 1, using it as a base for the continuing improvements to the Brighton main line, in between Selhurst traincare depot and the Three Bridges engineering depot.

On 14 January 2008, the station received a minor upgrade. This involved the replacing of the wooden huts with modern glass waiting areas and the installation of dynamic digital displays with information about the next train. Southeastern ceased to serve the station from December 2008.

A second PERTIS machine was installed at the entrance to the Horley-bound platform by 2008. Help points were installed in February 2011 to both platforms.

The PERTIS machine on platform one has been replaced in August 2011 by the installation of quick ticket machine on this platform to facilitate buying of tickets out of hours.

Since 20 May 2018 Salfords is served by the Thameslink service between Bedford and Gatwick Airport.

Services 
Off-peak, all services at Salfords are operated by Thameslink using  EMUs.

The typical off-peak service in trains per hour is:
 2 tph to  via 
 2 tph to Three Bridges via Gatwick Airport 

Although the station is outside Greater London, Oyster Pay as you go and contactless payment cards are valid. However, the station is outside the London Fare Zone area and as a result, special fares apply.

References

External links 

Railway stations in Surrey
Former London, Brighton and South Coast Railway stations
Railway stations in Great Britain opened in 1915
Railway stations served by Govia Thameslink Railway